Su Xing (Allen Su; born March 5, 1984) is a Chinese singer, songwriter and actor. He took the 2nd place in the 2007 Super Boy 快乐男声contest, which was a national singing contest for young male contestants held by Hunan Satellite Television. Although he was only 23 years old while participating in the contest, Allen appeared much more sophisticated than many other young men of his age. After winning second place in the contest, he released his first EP, including six brand new songs, of which two of them were written by Allen himself.

Born in Xi'an, the capital city of northwestern China's Shaanxi, Allen Su had always been an excellent student since childhood. When he was 17 years old, his parents sent him to Sydney to pursue his study. Allen managed to study business at Macquarie University, but soon he realized that he was not interested in business and what he really goes in for is music, so he transferred to SAE College Sydney to study in digital media. Allen came back to China to take part in the 2007 Super Boy contest with the simple thought of meeting people who could introduce him to record companies to help start his career, after the contest he went back to Sydney to finish his study, and achieved the Bachelor of Digital Media in 2008.

Biography

Early life
Allen Su was born in a well-off family, his talent in arts was inherited from his mother, Miao Ni Ya, who worked in Shaanxi Normal University after her graduation. Although Ms Miao was not a specialist in arts, dancing and singing were among her many accomplishments. According to Ms Miao, Allen had learned piano for several months in his childhood and his tutor appreciated his talent, but he ended his courses for little Allen was too restless to sit by the piano for hours, at that time he enjoyed playing football instead of the piano.

Allen appeared independent, quick-mind and persistent since very young. Being active in various sports and arts, he was also an excellent student and managed to go to one of the best senior high schools in ShaanXi Province: Xi'an Middle School, his scores always ranked top of his grade. Of course Allen Su is not a typical bookish person as you might think of, among his wide range of interests, painting, ballgames and singing are the most significant brilliance, he used to dream of becoming a painter or a football player.

At the age of 17, Allen decided to study abroad, he went to Sydney all by his own to pursue his future. As most young boys, he didn't figure out what he really wished to do at first, so he followed his family's will to study business. Soon he found out business couldn't be his career, so he decisively transferred from Macquarie University to SAE College Sydney.

Life is tough, especially for a young boy living abroad alone, but he is the last one in the world to say "give up". Just as his name Allen--which was named after his idol Allen Iverson—suggests, it implies a great spirit of tenacity. Although his family could afford the tuition, he decided to work his way through college, he even took several part jobs at a time to lighten the burden of his family.

During the seven years in Australia, Allen had a small 4-person band with his close friends, and engaged in a couple of local singing contests.

Career

2006: TVB8 New Talent Singing Awards 
In 2006, Allen took part in the New Talent Singing Awards regional contest in Sydney for the 2nd time, he won the championship and got the chance to contest in International Finals in Hong Kong. He got the sixth place in the final.

2007: Super Boy Contest
Allen's pursuit of his singing dream never stops. In 2007, he participated in the Super Boy contest organized by Hunan Satellite Television, his fans nationwide voted him the 2nd place in the final.

2007–2009

Discography

Albums and EP (extended play)
{| class="wikitable"
!align="left"|Album Type
!align="left"|Album Information
!align="left" width="250px"|Track listing
|-
|align="left"|1st EP
|align="left"|Autumn()
Released: December 18, 2007
Label: Sony Music
|style="font-size: 85%;"|
|-
|align="left"|1st Studio
|align="left"|LONG.ING(想念·式)Released: May 11, 2010
Label: Sony Music
|style="font-size: 85%;"|
|-
|align="left"|2nd Studio
|align="left"|Present Tense()Released: June 10, 2011
Label: Sony Music
|style="font-size: 85%;"|
|-
|align="left"|3rd Studio
|align="left"|New way of style''()
Released: October 22, 2012
Label: Sony Music
|style="font-size: 85%;"|
|-
|2nd EP
|Let the world listen
(让世界听见)
 Released: October 13, 2014
|
|-
|4th Studio
|Over 30
(三十未满)
 Released: December 25, 2014
 Label: Sony Music
|

|-
|5th Studio
|Someone
 Released: December 15, 2015
 Label: Sony Music
|
|-
|6th studio
|Stand up again
 Released: November 30, 2017
 Label: Xinglun Media Beijing
|
|}

Others
DVD
 秋天首唱会(DVD) LIVE全记录 (2007.12.29)

Compilations
 13 (2007)

 红星闪闪 (2009)

Singles

Filmography
 China Idol Boys (2009)
 Money and Love'' (2016)

Drama
Stage Play:  A Midsummer Night's Dream

Awards and nominations

References

External links
Official Blog (in Chinese)

1984 births
Living people
Chinese male stage actors
Male actors from Shaanxi
Chinese male singer-songwriters
Male actors from Xi'an
Macquarie University alumni
Musicians from Xi'an
Singers from Shaanxi
Writers from Xi'an
Chinese male film actors
Super Boy contestants